The Canada Energy Regulator (CER) is the agency of the Government of Canada under its Natural Resources Canada portfolio, which licenses, supervises, regulates and enforces all applicable Canadian laws as regards to interprovincial and international oil, gas, and electric utilities. The agency came into being on August 28, 2019, under the provision of the Canada Energy Regulator Act of the Parliament of Canada superseding the National Energy Board from which it took over regulatory responsibilities. The CER is headquartered in Calgary, Alberta. 

In August 2020, Gitane De Silva was appointed as the new CEO of the Canada Energy Regulator.

References

Energy in Canada
Federal departments and agencies of Canada
Oil pipelines in Canada
Natural gas pipelines in Canada
Energy regulatory authorities
2019 establishments in Canada
Government agencies established in 2019
Natural Resources Canada